Garella nilotica, the black-olive caterpillar or bungee caterpillar, is a moth of the family Nolidae. It was described by Alois Friedrich Rogenhofer in 1881. It has a pantropical distribution, including the eastern North America (from Ontario, Quebec, Nova Scotia and New York south to Florida and Texas), the Caribbean, the Iberian Peninsula, Australia, Guam, Fiji, Samoa, the Galápagos Islands and the Chagos Archipelago.

The wingspan is about 15 mm.

The larvae feed on various trees and shrubs in at least five families of broad-leaved plants, including Cynometra, Heritiera, Mangifera, Terminalia, Rhododendron, Bucida (including Bucida buceras), Canocarpus, Olea, Prunus, Salix and Tamarix species.

External links

BugGuide
Images
Lepidoptera of the French Antilles
Species Fact Sheet

Chloephorinae
Moths of Europe
Moths of North America
Pantropical fauna
Taxa named by Alois Friedrich Rogenhofer